Stratfield Turgis is a small village and civil parish in the north-east of the English county of Hampshire.

History
The name of Stratfield Turgis derives from its origins on open land (Old English feld) by the Roman road (Old English stræt) from Silchester to London, and the Turgis family, who held the manor of the de Ports and St. Johns from as early as 1270.

Governance
The village of Stratfield Turgis is part of the civil parish of Stratfield Turgis, and is part of the Pamber and Silchester ward of Basingstoke and Deane borough council. The borough council is a Non-metropolitan district of Hampshire County Council. According to the Post Office at the 2011 Census the population was included in the civil parish of Hartley Wespall.

Geography
It comprises the hamlets of Spanish Green and Turgis Green together with Stratfield Turgis itself and surrounding outlying farms.

Sport and leisure
Stratfield Turgis & Hartley Wespall Cricket Club play at Turgis Green.

Education
 Daneshill School is a preparatory school for boys and girls aged 3 to 13 years old. The school was founded in 1950 in Sherborne St John, under the name of St Salvator's. It moved to the Lutyens-designed Daneshill House in 1954, when it was renamed Daneshill School. In 1973 it moved to Dogmersfield Park, near Odiham; and in 1979 to "Bylands", Stratfield Turgis, its current home.

References

External links

 Stratfield Turgis & Hartley Wespall Cricket Club
 description and interior photo of listed C13 church

Villages in Hampshire
Civil parishes in Basingstoke and Deane